The Girl Who Played with Fire is a 2009 Swedish-Danish crime thriller film with German co-production directed by Daniel Alfredson from a screenplay of Jonas Frykberg and produced by Søren Stærmose. It is the sequel to The Girl with the Dragon Tattoo from the same year and based on the 2006 novel of the same name by Swedish writer Stieg Larsson, the second entry in his Millennium series.

Starring Michael Nyqvist and Noomi Rapace in the main roles, the film follows Lisbeth Salander as she returns to Sweden after spending a year abroad. She falls under suspicion of having murdered a journalist and his girlfriend, as well as her own social services guardian, Nils Bjurman, while Mikael Blomkvist tries to find her before the authorities.

The third part of the trilogy, The Girl Who Kicked the Hornets' Nest (Luftslottet som sprängdes), was released two months later, on 27 November 2009.

Plot
Lisbeth Salander purchases an apartment in Stockholm. On returning to Sweden after nearly a year living abroad, Salander reconnects with her best friend and former partner Miriam Wu and offers her free use of her old apartment in return for forwarding her mail. Later, Salander confronts Nils Bjurman after hacking into his mail and discovering that he has an appointment booked with a tattoo removal specialist. Threatening him with his own gun, she warns him not to remove the tattoo that she etched on his abdomen.

Millennium magazine welcomes Dag Svensson, a new journalist who is writing an exposé on prostitution and human trafficking in Sweden. Dag's girlfriend, Mia Bergman, is writing her doctoral thesis on sex trafficking. Dag is nearly finished with the story and is confronting those who will be exposed by the article. Dag and his girlfriend are about to leave on a holiday and ask Mikael Blomkvist to come to his apartment and collect some photographs. At the same time Dag also asks Blomkvist to inquire about someone called "Zala," who may have a connection to his present research. Blomkvist arrives at their apartment and finds the two lying dead. The murder weapon is tracked to Bjurman who is also deceased. Salander is the prime suspect, as her fingerprints happen to be on the gun. Salander tells Blomkvist that she did not kill anyone and that he needs to find the mysterious "Zala."

Blomkvist is contacted by Salander's boxing trainer and friend, Paolo Roberto.  While he is unaware of Salander's whereabouts, Paolo does know Miriam, who also trained with them, and promises to pay her a visit. Near her apartment, Paolo witnesses Miriam being kidnapped by strongman Ronald Niedermann. Paolo follows his car to a deserted barn, where he hears him beat Miriam for information about Salander. Paolo comes in to rescue her but Niedermann beats him too. He then sets the barn aflame, but the two manage to escape.

News breaks of the attack, and Paolo gives his account to the police. After Blomkvist leaves information that he has discovered about the case on his computer for Salander to hack into and read, she leaves a message to him saying, "Thank you for being my friend." He realizes that she intends to set out alone to find the man who framed her and that she may not survive. A disguised Salander visits Miriam in hospital to apologize for getting her involved. Without giving anything away, Salander confirms the police sketch of Niedermann with Miriam and then disappears. Knowing now that he is Salander's friend, Miriam calls Blomkvist to the hospital to give him keys that Lisbeth dropped during her visit. Noticing that one of them is for a post office box, Blomkvist is able to access and read Salander's mail and locate her apartment. Meanwhile, Salander continues her efforts to find Niedermann by patiently staking out his post office box. She eventually sees someone retrieve his mail and follows him to a small house near Gosseberga. Reading the material in Lisbeth's apartment, Blomkvist finds the video of Bjurman raping Salander.

In the offices of Millennium magazine, Paolo explains that he tracked down Niedermann and learned that he has congenital analgesia which makes him unable to feel pain. They trace Niedermann to a company owned by "Karl Axel Bodin." Blomkvist has Erika Berger forward documents to Bublanski and sets out to find Salander.

Salander crosses the grounds and enters the Gosseberga house, but Niedermann has been alerted by motion detectors and knocks her out. She awakens to see her father, Alexander "Zala" Zalachenko, an old man who walks with a stick and is heavily scarred by the burns that she inflicted as a child. He dismisses her mother as a whore and belittles her rape at the hands of Bjurman. He reveals that Niedermann is her half-brother and that Niedermann killed Bjurman to prevent him from revealing any of Zalachenko's secrets.

They lead Lisbeth to a shallow grave in the woods. She tells him that the police will find him soon and all that he has said has been published online through her hidden cellphone. Seeing through her bluff, he shoots Lisbeth several times as she attempts to escape and buries her alive. Salander digs her way out using her cigarette case. Hidden in the woodshed, she surprises Zalachenko and sticks an axe into his leg. She then keeps Niedermann at bay with Zalachenko's gun as Blomkvist comes coasting up the driveway. Ambulances and police arrive to take away Salander and Zalachenko who are both very badly injured.

Cast

Production
Daniel Alfredson takes over from Niels Arden Oplev, who directed The Girl with the Dragon Tattoo, the first part of the trilogy.

Reception

Critical response

The film received mostly positive reviews from critics, although some noted it as a step down from its predecessor. On review aggregation website Rotten Tomatoes, the film holds an approval rating of 69% based on 156 reviews with an average rating of 6.2/10.

Roger Ebert of the Chicago Sun-Times gives the film three and a half out of four stars, describing the film as a step down from The Girl With the Dragon Tattoo, but only because the first film was so "fresh and unexpected". A. O. Scott of The New York Times praises Rapace's performance, stating, "tiny and agile, her steely rage showing now and then the tiniest crack of vulnerability, belongs to another dimension altogether. She makes this movie good enough, but also makes you wish it were much better." Lisa Kennedy of The Denver Post describes Lisbeth Salander as "worth the trouble" and having a "cold stare" the like of which has not been seen since "Clint was roaming the Italian hillsides." She notes the film uses the linked themes of bureaucratic corruption and misogyny, where the previous film linked misogyny with fascism. The review contrasts the violence against women and heroism of Fire with the violence of The Killer Inside Me, complaining that the latter gives in to the worst impulses, noting that only the former story "works,” as some redemption is provided through revenge.

Michael Phillips of the Chicago Tribune writes that the film is much the same as its predecessor, despite the new director (Daniel Alfredson) and screenwriter (Jonas Frykberg), and is likely to please those who enjoyed the first film. He observes that Rapace remains the chief asset of the series, and that she works well with Michael Nyqvist, who he likens to a more sincere, Swedish version of Larry Hagman. He writes further that even though Rapace and Nyqvist "could not be better" in their roles, the film should acknowledge the middle ground between the righteous heroes and the evil villains in order to work better as cinematic pulp fiction.

Peter Travers of Rolling Stone gives the film 3 out of 4 stars.

Rick Groen of The Globe and Mail describes the film as "Tepid and downright confusing" for those who have not read the books, although he suspects there are few who have not; he notes that the plot, "already thick on the page, often seems impenetrable here." Although he concedes the plot generates some suspense, he complains it more often results in confusion but hopes the final film in the trilogy will bring greater clarity.

Box office
Prior to its release in the United States, the film had already earned $51,259,526 at the international box office.

During its first week of release in the United States, it grossed $904,998, being released in three times as many theaters as the first film and grossing three times as much. The film has a worldwide gross of $67,126,795.

References

External links
 
 
 
 

Millennium (novel series) adaptations
2009 films
2009 crime thriller films
2000s mystery thriller films
Danish crime thriller films
Danish sequel films
Films about human trafficking
Films about journalists
Films based on crime novels
Films based on mystery novels
Films based on Swedish novels
Films based on thriller novels
Films directed by Daniel Alfredson
Films set in Stockholm
Films shot in Stockholm
German crime thriller films
German films about revenge
German mystery thriller films
German sequel films
Incest in film
Nordisk Film films
Swedish crime thriller films
Swedish detective films
2000s Swedish-language films
Swedish mystery thriller films
Swedish sequel films
Films shot in the Algarve
2000s German films
2000s Swedish films